Narsingh Rajput (born 22 January 1970) is an Indian film director and producer known for his works in Hindi cinema's like Tom Dick and Harry.

Filmography
 Tom, Dick and Harry 2
 Tom Dick and Harry 
 Fun – Can Be Dangerous Sometimes
 Na Tum Jaano Na Hum
 Push Scooter

References

External links
 

1960 births
Living people
Hindi-language film directors
Indian television directors
21st-century Indian film directors